State Route 4 (SR 4) is a  state highway, serving the southwestern region of the U.S. state of Washington. The highway, also known as Ocean Beach Highway, travels east along the Columbia River from U.S. Route 101 (US 101) at Johnston's Landing through Pacific, Wahkiakum and Cowlitz counties to an interchange with Interstate 5 (I-5) in Kelso. SR 4 is designated as part of the Lewis and Clark Trail Scenic Byway, a state scenic byway, as well as part of the National Highway System.

The highway, along with I-5 and SR 14, forms the former route of US 830, which ran along the Columbia River from Johnston's Landing to Maryhill from the creation of the United States Numbered Highways in 1926 until 1968. US 830 was co-signed with Primary State Highway 12 (PSH 12) from Johnston's Landing to Kelso and was created in 1937 as the successor to various unsigned state highways.

Route description

SR 4 begins at an intersection with US 101 at Johnston's Landing, located on the Naselle River in rural Pacific County. The highway, designated as the Lewis and Clark Trail Scenic Byway, travels southeast along the Naselle River and serves as the northern terminus of SR 401 in the census-designated place of Naselle before leaving the Naselle River. SR 4 continues east along Salmon Creek and the Deep River into Wahkiakum County before it intersects the former route of SR 403 in Rosburg. The highway travels upstream along the Grays River and turns southeast towards Skamokawa, passing east of the Julia Butler Hansen Refuge for the Columbian White-Tailed Deer on the shores of the Columbia River. SR 4 continues east through the county seat of Cathlamet and intersects the former terminus of SR 407 and the northern terminus of SR 409. The highway travels into Cowlitz County and intersects the western terminus of SR 432, which serves the Port of Longview, in West Longview. SR 4 continues through the northern part of Longview and passes the campus of the Lower Columbia College before traveling onto Cowlitz Way. Cowlitz Way intersects the former spur route of SR 411 and crosses over SR 411 and the Cowlitz River into Kelso before SR 4 splits into a one-way pair traveling south through downtown Kelso. SR 4 turns east onto Allen Street and continues to its eastern terminus, a diamond interchange with I-5 north of the Three Rivers Mall.

Every year, the Washington State Department of Transportation (WSDOT) conducts a series of surveys on its highways in the state to measure traffic volume. This is expressed in terms of average annual daily traffic (AADT), which is a measure of traffic volume for any average day of the year. In 2011, WSDOT calculated that the busiest section of SR 4 was the intersection with Catlin Street in Kelso west of the Cowlitz Way Bridge, serving 34,000 vehicles daily, while the least busy section was between Rosburg and Cathlamet in rural Wahkiakum County, serving less than 1,000 vehicles per day. The entire route of SR 4 is designated as part of the National Highway System, a highway system that includes roadways important to the national economy, defense, and mobility; and as a Highway of Statewide Significance by WSDOT from US 101 at Johnston's Landing to SR 432 in West Longview, which includes highways that connect major communities in the state of Washington.

History

The present route of SR 4 was codified into the state highway system in 1915 as State Road 19, connecting Naselle, Cathlamet, Longview, and Kelso along the Columbia River. The highway was built by Pacific County in the Naselle area and Cowlitz County between Stella and Kelso, while the Department of Highways built a road connecting Cathlamet to Skamokawa by 1915. State Road 19 was officially designated as the Ocean Beach Highway in 1919 and renumbered to State Road 12 in 1923. The highway was incorporated into US 830 during the creation of the United States Numbered Highways in 1926, traveling east along the Columbia River from US 101 at Johnston's Landing to US 97 in Maryhill. The highway was paved with the macadam method between Johnston's Landing and Grays River and between Skamokawa and Kelso by 1931. The remaining gap was constructed of gravel by 1933 and the entire highway was paved by 1939. State Road 12 was replaced by PSH 12 in 1937, traveling west from PSH 1 and US 99 in Chehalis to PSH 13 in Raymond, south on US 101 to Johnston's Landing, and east on US 830 to PSH 1 and US 99 in Kelso. During the 1964 highway renumbering, US 830 replaced PSH 12 between Johnston's Landing and Kelso and was designated as part of the Lewis and Clark Trail Scenic Byway during the creation of the state scenic highway system in 1967. US 830 was decommissioned in 1968 and was replaced with SR 4; however, the highway was proposed as a route for US 12 before it was extended west via White Pass to Aberdeen.

Major intersections

References

External links

Highways of Washington State

004
Transportation in Pacific County, Washington
Transportation in Wahkiakum County, Washington
Transportation in Cowlitz County, Washington